Club Deportivo Llanes is a football team based in Llanes in the autonomous community of Asturias. Founded in 1949, the team plays in Tercera División RFEF – Group 2. The club's home ground is San José, which has a capacity of 2,000 spectators.

History
CD Llanes was founded in 1949 and played its first 50 years in the Regional divisions. In 1999 the club achieves its first promotion ever to Tercera División, where it played almost every season since that year.

In 2009 and 2010, the club qualified for the promotion playoffs to Segunda División B. In its first attempt, Llanes was eliminated in the first round by Alicante B after a penalty shoot-out. Its second participation was better, as they eliminated Valladolid B in the first round, but they were beaten 6–0 by Tudelano in the second leg of the second round. Llanes came back to the playoffs in 2018, but again failed in the first round.

On 11 September 2019, the club won the Copa Federación.

Season to season

20 seasons in Tercera División
1 season in Tercera División RFEF

Honours
Copa Federación de España (Asturias tournament): (1) 2019

Women's team
Llanes had a women's team between 2001 and 2005, that played in the Regional league during four seasons. On 6 April 2019, the club announced the return of the section, starting to play in the 2019–20 season.

Season by season

Famous players
 Yefri Reyes
 Gerardo Noriega
 Christopher Marques

References

External links
Official website 
Futbolme.com profile 

Llanes
Football clubs in Asturias
Association football clubs established in 1949
1949 establishments in Spain